The 2019 Erovnuli Liga 2 (formerly known as Pirveli Liga) was the 31st season of second tier football in Georgia. The season began on 2 March 2019 and ended on 30 November 2019.

Teams and stadiums

'* Tshkinvali are based in South Ossetia and not allowed to play their home games in the area due to safety reasons.

Source:

League table

Relegation play-offs 

Aragvi Dusheti won 2–1 on aggregate.

Samgurali Tskhaltubo won 9–0 on aggregate.

References

External links
  
Georgian Football Federation

Erovnuli Liga 2 seasons
2
Georgia
Georgia